John Palmer Fishwick (September 29, 1916 – August 9, 2010) was an American railroad executive and chief executive of Norfolk and Western Railway.

Born in Roanoke, Virginia, John was a graduate of Jefferson High School in downtown. He was one of four children, having two sisters and one brother, noted literary scholar and author, Marshall Fishwick. Fishwick attended Roanoke College, where he was a member of Kappa Alpha Order and served as editor of the College's newspaper. He graduated in 1937 with a major in English and a minor in economics. Fishwick furthered his education at Harvard Law School, graduating in 1940. After completing law school he worked as an associate with Cravath, Swaine & Moore before joining the Navy in 1942. Fishwick left the United States Navy as a lieutenant commander. After World War II he joined Norfolk and Western in November 1945 and worked as assistant to the general counsel. In 1947, he was promoted to assistant general solicitor, and in 1951 he was promoted to assistant general counsel. In 1954, he was promoted yet again, this time to general solicitor. He served as general counsel until his promotion to chief executive in 1970.

He served as the chief executive of Norfolk and Western from 1970 to 1981, his leadership was integral in the merger with Southern Railway to create the current Norfolk Southern Railway. After his retirement, he became a partner with Windels Marx Lane & Mittendorf until his retirement in 1986.

Fishwick's wife, Blair, was a fellow Roanoke College graduate. They had three children together and she was a well known artist in the Roanoke area. She died in June, 1987. Mr. Fishwick married Doreen Hamilton in 1989. Fishwick's son, John Fishwick, Jr., served as U.S. Attorney and is a practicing lawyer in Roanoke.

On July 16, 2018 the Roanoke City School Board announced that Stonewall Jackson Middle School in Roanoke, VA would be renamed John P. Fishwick Middle School.

References

External links
History of Salem, Virginia

1916 births
2010 deaths
People from Roanoke, Virginia
Military personnel from Virginia
Businesspeople from Virginia
Roanoke College alumni
Harvard Law School alumni
20th-century American businesspeople
Cravath, Swaine & Moore associates
American chief executives